Maidstone Manor Farm, also known as William R. Leigh House, is a national historic district located near Hedgesville, Berkeley County, West Virginia. It encompasses a historic farm with three contributing buildings and one contributing site, the site of a slave cabin.  The plantation house is a two-story, square brick dwelling with a slate covered pyramidal roof.  It is three bays wide and two bays deep and features a one bay entrance portico supported by paired Doric order columns.  Also on the property are a barn and brick smokehouse.  It was the birthplace of noted artist William Robinson Leigh (1866-1955), father of William Colston Leigh, Sr. (1901-1992).

It was listed on the National Register of Historic Places in 1980.

References

Farms on the National Register of Historic Places in West Virginia
Houses on the National Register of Historic Places in West Virginia
Historic districts in Berkeley County, West Virginia
Houses completed in 1848
Houses in Berkeley County, West Virginia
Plantation houses in West Virginia
Plantations in West Virginia
National Register of Historic Places in Berkeley County, West Virginia
Historic districts on the National Register of Historic Places in West Virginia
Slave cabins and quarters in the United States